Fengpu Avenue is a station on Line 5 of the Shanghai Metro. Located at Fengpu Avenue and Huhang Highway in the city's Fengxian District, the station is located on the main branch of Line 5 and opened as part of the southern extension of Line 5 on 30 December 2018. It is an elevated station. During the planning stages and early part of construction, it was known simply as Fengpu.

References 

Railway stations in Shanghai
Shanghai Metro stations in Fengxian District
Railway stations in China opened in 2018
Line 5, Shanghai Metro